Jan Bredack (born 24 April 1972) is a German entrepreneur. He is the founder and CEO of Veganz, a German wholesaler and supermarket chain for plant-based products.

Bredack was born on 9 April 1972 in Salzwedel, a small town in East Germany. The first Veganz store was in Berlin's Prenzlauer Berg neighbourhood.

References

1972 births
Businesspeople from Saxony-Anhalt
Living people
People from Salzwedel
German chief executives
Food and drink company founders
German company founders